Leigh Stefan Lanham (born 15 August 1977 in Ipswich, Suffolk) is a former motorcycle speedway rider from England.

Career
Son of former rider Mike, Lanham won the British Under 21 Championship in 1997. He reached the World Under 21 Final in 1996 and 1998 and has finished in the top six of the British Speedway Championship.

In December 2011 he signed to ride for Coventry Bees in the Elite League as a double-up rider, sharing a team place with Aaron Summers.  Following the closure of the Premier League Newport Wasps team, Lanham rode for the Rye House Rockets for a short period, before re-joining his home town club Ipswich Witches, following an injury to Morten Risager. Leigh retired from speedway in January 2017 at the age of 39.

On 14 September 2018, Lanham was chosen to ride the final 4 laps at the Arena Essex raceway. During his ten years with the Arena Essex Hammers and Lakeside Hammers, Lanham became the club's all-time leading appearance maker and highest points scorer.

References 

1977 births
Living people
British speedway riders
English motorcycle racers
Lakeside Hammers riders
Ipswich Witches riders
King's Lynn Stars riders
Bradford Dukes riders
Exeter Falcons riders
Newport Wasps riders
Rye House Rockets riders
Coventry Bees riders